Anomis editrix, the Gulf scalloped moth, is an owlet moth in the family Erebidae. The species was first described by Achille Guenée in 1852. It is found in North and Central America.

The MONA or Hodges number for Anomis editrix is 8553.

References

Further reading

 
 
 

Scoliopteryginae
Articles created by Qbugbot
Moths described in 1852